Eucalyptus latens, commonly known as narrow-leaved red mallee, is a species of mallee that is endemic to the south-west of Western Australia. It has smooth grey and coppery bark, linear to narrow lance-shaped adult leaves, flower buds in groups of seven to eleven or more, creamy white flowers and small barrel-shaped to shortened spherical fruit.

Description
It has smooth, grey to coppery bark. Flowering occurs between January and March and the flowers are creamy white.

Taxonomy and naming
Eucalyptus latens was first formally described in 1998 by Ian Brooker from a specimen he collected near North Bannister and the description was published in the journal Nuytsia The specific epithet (latens) is a Latin word meaning "hidden" or "secret", in reference to the type population being "hidden" in the jarrah forest.

Distribution and habitat
Narrow-leaved red mallee is found in woodland near North Bannister, Highbury, Kulin and near Boyagin Rock in the southern Wheatbelt region of Western Australia, growing in sandy-clay soils over laterite.

Conservation status
This eucalypt is classified as "not threatened" by the Western Australian Government Department of Parks and Wildlife.

See also

List of Eucalyptus species

References

Eucalypts of Western Australia
Trees of Australia
latens
Myrtales of Australia
Mallees (habit)
Plants described in 1988
Taxa named by Ian Brooker